Addala-Shukhgelmeer is a mountain in the Caucasus Mountains of  Dagestan, Russia. 

Under the mountain lies the mountain village of Aknada (Kizilyurt District). At an elevation of 4152 m Addala-Shukhgelmeer is the 3rd highest mountain of Dagestan and the 40th highest in Russia.

References

External links 

 
 Hiking in the area

Four-thousanders of the Caucasus
Mountains of Dagestan